is a Japanese video game designer and programmer at R.U.N (Release Universe Network) and a former Fill-in-Cafe and Treasure game designer. He joined Treasure from April 1993 to April 2004. He established the company R.U.N with former Fill-in-Cafe employee Masatoshi Imaizumi.

Works
Director
 Guardian Heroes
 Silhouette Mirage

Game designer
 Code of Princess
 Bangai-O Spirits
 Mad Stalker: Full Metal Force (with Masatoshi Imaizumi)

Programmer
 Advance Guardian Heroes
 Mad Stalker: Full Metal Force (with Masatoshi Imaizumi)
 Phantom Breaker (with Masatoshi Imaizumi)
 Rakugaki Showtime
 Silhouette Mirage
 Silpheed: The Lost Planet
 Sin & Punishment: Star Successor
 Tiny Toon Adventures: Defenders of the Universe (Cancelled)
 Yū Yū Hakusho Makyō Tōitsusen

Graphic designer
 Mad Stalker: Full Metal Force (with Masatoshi Imaizumi)

Localization
 Silhouette Mirage

External links

Living people
Japanese video game designers
Year of birth missing (living people)
Place of birth missing (living people)